Victoire Berteau (born 16 August 2000) is a French professional racing cyclist, who currently rides for UCI Women's Continental Team .

Major results

2022
 Tour de France
 Stage 5

References

External links
 

2000 births
Living people
French female cyclists
Olympic cyclists of France
Cyclists at the 2020 Summer Olympics
People from Douai
Sportspeople from Nord (French department)
Cyclists from Hauts-de-France
21st-century French women